Senator Britt may refer to:

Danny Britt (born 1979), North Carolina State Senate
Gwendolyn T. Britt (1941–2008), Maryland State Senate
James Jefferson Britt (1861–1939), North Carolina State Senate
Katie Britt (born 1982), U.S. Senator from Alabama